Natasha Mealey (born 27 November 1982 in Torquay) is an English model.

Education and career
A former architecture student, she modelled topless for newspapers such as The Sun and Daily Star, as well as in lad mags such as GQ, FHM, Front, and Maxim. She was also bylined for a raunchy advice column in Maxim.

In 2003, Mealey starred in the music video for Boogie Pimps version of the disco/house track "Somebody to Love". She also appeared in the 2003 video for the dirty house single "Satisfaction" by Benny Benassi. She was depicted in the 2004 Pirelli Calendar. In the 2000s, she featured in numerous DVDs produced by Maxim magazine. She also designed lingerie and jewellery.

See also

 Lad culture
 Page 3

References

External links
 
 Natasha Mealey on Myspace

1982 births
Glamour models
Living people
Page 3 girls
People from Torquay